Michael Anthony Peña (born January 13, 1976) is an American actor. He has starred in many films, including Crash (2004), World Trade Center (2006), Shooter (2007), Observe and Report (2009), Tower Heist (2011), Battle: Los Angeles (2011), End of Watch (2012), and Gangster Squad (2013). He has also acted in films such as American Hustle (2013), The Martian (2015), Ant-Man (2015) and its sequel Ant-Man and the Wasp (2018). Peña had the title role in Cesar Chavez (2014) and played DEA agent Kiki Camarena in season one of the Netflix series Narcos: Mexico (2018).

He was nominated for the Independent Spirit Award for Best Supporting Male for his performance in End of Watch.

Early life
Peña was born in Chicago, Illinois, the son of Nicolasa, a social worker, and Eleuterio Peña, a factory worker. Peña's parents were originally farmers, and emigrated from Mexico; his father was from Villa Purificación, Jalisco, and his mother was from Charcas, San Luis Potosí. He grew up in the North Lawndale area and attended Marist High School, and graduated from Hubbard High School where he participated and was a state qualifier in wrestling and track. He attended St. Nicholas of Tolentine Elementary.

Career

Film
Though Peña has been a regular in independent productions since 1994, his breakthrough performances came in two Best Picture Oscar-winning Paul Haggis-penned films, Million Dollar Baby (2004) and Crash (2004). The former was directed by Clint Eastwood, and the latter was directed by Haggis. Though both films are critically acclaimed, Peña received attention for his particularly emotional performance in Crash. The following year, he appeared on the Golden Globe-winning series The Shield.  he starred in Oliver Stone's film based on the September 11, 2001 attacks, World Trade Center. He also had a small role in Alejandro González Iñárritu's film Babel. This gives him the rare distinction of having appeared in three consecutive Oscar-nominated films.

In 2006, Peña starred in the HBO film Walkout as Sal Castro, a Mexican-American high school teacher who inspires a group of East L.A. high school students to fight for Chicano rights.

He starred alongside Mark Wahlberg in Shooter (2007) as novice FBI agent Nick Memphis. In 2009, he played a mall security guard alongside Seth Rogen in Jody Hill's Observe and Report.

In 2012, he co-starred with Jake Gyllenhaal as a Los Angeles police officer, in End of Watch. The same year, he began filming César Chávez, a biopic about the life of American labor leader César Chávez, who founded the United Farm Workers. Peña stars as Chávez. He appeared alongside Brad Pitt, Shia LaBeouf, Logan Lerman, and Jon Bernthal in the World War II-set action film Fury (2014), and portrayed Luis in Ant-Man (2015).

In 2015, Peña was a principal-player of the ensemble-cast for his role on board the Ares-III space-craft to Mars, in the award-winning Ridley Scott sci-film The Martian.
Peña starred in 12 Strong alongside Chris Hemsworth. He also starred in the 2018 remake of A Wrinkle in Time, where he played the main antagonist, The IT, in his human form (known as "Red"). In 2020, Peña took a turn as the mysterious and enigmatic Mr. Roarke in the critically panned prequel Fantasy Island (Film)

Television
In December 2017, it was reported that Peña had joined the cast of Narcos for its upcoming fourth season. It was later revealed that the fourth season would be a new series, Narcos: Mexico, with Peña starring as DEA agent Kiki Camarena.

Voice acting
Peña voiced the character Ricky in the FX animated comedy Chozen. In Turbo, he voiced Tito. He also provided vocals for the character Marguerite (in the episode "Hot Water") for the popular animated series American Dad.

Music
In 2005, Peña formed the Los Angeles rock band Nico Vega, named after his mother, Nicolasa. He left the band in 2007 to concentrate on his acting career, but co-wrote the track "Beast", which reached No. 26 on the Billboard Hot Rock Songs Chart. Peña starred in a video created for Midlake's track "Bethel Woods", which premiered Jan. 12, 2022.

Personal life 
Peña has been a member of Scientology since 2000.

In 2006, he married Brie Shaffer. They have one son, named Roman, born in 2008.

Filmography

Film

Television

Video game

References

External links
 
 Q&A Sessions: Michael Peña
 Lions for Lambs interview

1976 births
Male actors from Chicago
American male actors of Mexican descent
American male film actors
American Scientologists
American male television actors
Hispanic and Latino American male actors
Living people
20th-century American male actors
21st-century American male actors
Outstanding Performance by a Cast in a Motion Picture Screen Actors Guild Award winners